Wochua (singular Achua) was the endonym of a pygmy people of the forests of the Democratic Republic of the Congo, south of the Welle River. They were first described in the Western world in 1880–1883 by Wilhelm Junker. They may be the same as the Kango Mbuti, who are called Batchua (the root is Twa, pronounced Cwa  in Congo); they are reported to have associated with the Maigo (patrons of the Kango), the Momfu (patrons of the Efé, but Wochua is a Bantu term), and the Mabode (unidentified).

References

Junker, W. 1892. Travels in Africa during the years 1875[−1886]

Ethnic groups in the Democratic Republic of the Congo
African Pygmies